Canningius is a genus of prehistoric lobe-finned fish which belonged to the family of Tristichopteridae.

References

External links
 Classification of Tetrapodomorpha at Fish Index

Tristichopterids
Prehistoric lobe-finned fish genera
Devonian bony fish